The 1963 European Ladies' Team Championship took place 16–21 July on the Rungsted Golf Club 15 kilometres south of Helsingør, Denmark. It was the third ladies' amateur golf European Ladies' Team Championship.

Format 
All participating teams played two qualification rounds of stroke play, counting the three best scores out of up to four players for each team. The four best teams formed flight A. Since team West Germany was disqualified, there were three remaining teams and they formed flight B.

The winner in each flight was determined by a round-robin system. All teams in the flight met each other and the team with most points for team matches in flight A won the tournament, using the scale, win=2 points, halved=1 point, lose=0 points. In each match between two nation teams, two foursome games and four single games were played.

Teams 
Eight nation teams contested the event. Each team consisted of a minimum of four players.

Players in the leading teams

Other participating teams

Winners 
Team Belgium won the championship for the first time. Defending champions team France earned second place, on the same amount of match points as Belgium, but with lesser won game points. The championship was decided in the last match between Belgium and France and the last single game between Josyane Leysen, Belgium and Lally de Saint-Sauveur, France. The game was tied going into the last hole were both players had putts for birdie. After Segard had failed to make her putt, Leysen made her birdie putt from 5 meters, why Leysen won the game and Belgium tied the match.

Sweden, for the first time on the podium, earned third place. Host nation Denmark made their first appearance in the championship and finished fourth.

Individual winner in the opening 36-hole stroke play qualifying competition was Liv Forsell, Sweden, with a score of 5-over-par 151.

Results 
Qualification rounds

Team standings

* Note: In the event of a tie the order was determined by the better total non-counting scores.

** Note: Team West Germany was disqualified due to two cases of signing a wrong score card at the first qualifying round.

Individual leaders

 Note: There was no official recognition for the lowest individual score.

Flight A

Team matches

Team standings

Flight B

Team matches

Team standings

Final standings

Sources:

See also 
 Espirito Santo Trophy – biennial world amateur team golf championship for women organized by the International Golf Federation.
 European Amateur Team Championship – European amateur team golf championship for men organised by the European Golf Association.

References

External links 
 European Golf Association: Results

European Ladies' Team Championship
Golf tournaments in Denmark
European Ladies' Team Championship
European Ladies' Team Championship
European Ladies' Team Championship